Augustus Goetz (August 21, 1904 – December 7, 1976) was an American rower. He competed in the men's coxed pair event at the 1928 Summer Olympics.

References

External links
 

1904 births
1976 deaths
American male rowers
Olympic rowers of the United States
Rowers at the 1928 Summer Olympics
Rowers from Philadelphia